Albert James MacLachlan (18 February 1892 – 1956) was a Scottish professional football defender who played for Aston Villa, Aberdeen and Heart of Midlothian.

MacLachlan joined Aston Villa from St Cuthbert Wanderers in 1913, but played only three games for the English club. He moved to Aberdeen in 1914, where he was appointed captain in 1919 having served as a gunner during World War I. He left Aberdeen for Heart of Midlothian in 1927, and died in 1956.

His brothers Fred and John were also footballers.

Career statistics

Club

Appearances and goals by club, season and competition

References

1892 births
1956 deaths
People from Kirkcudbright
Association football defenders
Scottish footballers
Aston Villa F.C. players
Aberdeen F.C. players
Heart of Midlothian F.C. players
players
Elgin City F.C. players
Scottish Football League players
Highland Football League players
British Army personnel of World War I
English Football League players
Footballers from Dumfries and Galloway
St Cuthbert Wanderers F.C. players
Scottish Football League representative players